Sylvester James Gates Jr. (born December 15, 1950), known as S. James Gates Jr. or Jim Gates, is an American theoretical physicist who works on supersymmetry, supergravity, and superstring theory. He currently holds the Clark Leadership Chair in Science with the physics department at the University of Maryland College of Computer, Mathematical, and Natural Sciences. He is also affiliated with the University Maryland's School of Public Policy. He served on former President Barack Obama's Council of Advisors on Science and Technology.

Biography

Gates, the oldest of four siblings, was born in Tampa, Florida, the son of Sylvester James Gates Sr. a career U.S. Army man, and Charlie Engels Gates. His mother died at age 42 of breast cancer when he was 11. Gates, Sr. raised his children while serving full time in the U.S. Army and retired as a sergeant major after 27 years of service — one of the first African Americans to earn this position. Gates, Sr., later worked in public education and as a union organizer.

When his father remarried, his stepmother, a teacher, brought books into the home and emphasized the importance of education. The family moved many times while Gates was growing up, but, as he was entering 11th grade, settled in Orlando, Florida, where James attended Jones High School—his first experience in a segregated African-American school. Comparing his own school's quality to neighboring white schools, "I understood pretty quickly that the cards were really stacked against us." Nevertheless, an 11th grade course in physics established Gates' career interest in that field, especially its mathematical side. At his father's urging, he applied for admission to MIT.

Gates received two BS degrees from MIT in Mathematics and Physics (1973) as well as his PhD (1977). His doctoral thesis was the first at MIT on supersymmetry. With M. T. Grisaru, M. Rocek and W. Siegel, Gates coauthored Superspace, or One thousand and one lessons in supersymmetry (1984), the first comprehensive book on supersymmetry.

In 1984 he gained an associate professor position at the University of Maryland (UMD) Physics Department. In 1988, he became the Professor of Physics at UMD, a position he held until 2017, becoming the first African American to have an endowed position at a major American research university.  In 2022 Gates rejoined the University of Maryland as the John S. Toll Professor of Physics, Clark Leadership Chair in Science in the Department of Physics and the School of Public Policy at the University of Maryland.

Gates is on the board of trustees of Society for Science & the Public and is active in scientific outreach.

Gates was a Martin Luther King Jr. Visiting Scholar at MIT (2010–11) and was a Residential Scholar at MIT's Simmons Hall. He is pursuing ongoing research into string theory, supersymmetry, and supergravity. His current research focus is on Adinkra symbols, a graph-theoretic technique for studying supersymmetric representation theories.

In 2018, Gates was elected to the presidential line of the American Physical Society: he began serving as its Vice President in 2019, served as President in 2021, and Past-President in 2022.

Awards and recognition

Gates' work has earned him recognition by Mathematically Gifted & Black as a Black History Month 2017 Honoree.

On February 1, 2013, Gates was a recipient of the National Medal of Science. Gates was elected to the American Philosophical Society in 2012, and the National Academy of Sciences in 2013.

Gates was nominated by the Department of Energy as one of the USA Science and Engineering Festival's "Nifty Fifty" Speakers to present his work and career to middle- and high-school students in October 2010.

On December 5, 2016, Gates spoke at the 2016 Quadrennial Physics Congress, the largest ever gathering of physics undergraduates.

In 1994, Gates received the Edward A. Bouchet Award from the American Physical Society "for his contributions to theoretical high-energy physics."

Media appearances
Gates has been featured in TurboTax and Verizon commercials and has been featured extensively on NOVA PBS programs on physics, notably The Elegant Universe (2003). He completed a DVD series titled Superstring Theory: The DNA of Reality (2006) for The Teaching Company consisting of 24 half-hour lectures to make the complexities of unification theory comprehensible to laypeople.

During the 2008 World Science Festival, Gates narrated a ballet "The Elegant Universe", where he gave a public presentation of the artistic forms connected to his scientific research. Gates Appeared on the 2011 Isaac Asimov Memorial Debate: The Theory of Everything, hosted by Neil DeGrasse Tyson. Gates also appeared in the BBC Horizon documentary The Hunt for Higgs in 2012, and the NOVA documentary Big Bang Machine in 2015.

Publications 
 Superspace or 1001 Lessons in Supersymmetry, (with M. T. Grisaru, M. Roček, and W. Siegel), Benjamin-Cummings Publishing Company (1983), Reading, MA (On-line; http://aps.arXiv.org/pdf/hep-th/0108200).
 L'arte della fisica superspace, Stringhe, superstringhe, teoria unificata dei campi, 2006, Di Renzo Editore, .
 Reality in the Shadows (or) What the Heck's the Higgs?, (with Steven Jacob Sekula and Frank Blitzer), YBK Publishers, Inc. (2018), New York, New York,.
 Proving Einstein Right: The Daring Expeditions that Changed How We Look at the Universe, (with Cathie Pelletier), Publisher: PublicAffairs (September 24, 2019) .

Notes

External links

Gates, Sylvester James Jr. Interviewed by David Zierler. 30 July and 3 August 2020. American Institute of Physics.

1950 births
Living people
21st-century American physicists
University of Maryland, College Park faculty
Brown University faculty
American string theorists
Jones High School (Orlando, Florida) alumni
Fellows of the American Academy of Arts and Sciences
Members of the United States National Academy of Sciences
MIT Center for Theoretical Physics alumni
MIT Department of Physics alumni
21st-century African-American scientists
20th-century African-American people
African-American physicists
Fellows of the American Physical Society